Cathedral of Coimbra can refer either of two cathedrals: 

 The Old Cathedral of Coimbra
 The New Cathedral of Coimbra